Pseudocordulia is a small genus of dragonflies that are endemic to tropical northeastern Australia. They are medium-sized, bronze-black dragonflies with clear wings. Its taxonomic placement has varied, with some authors placing it in the monotypic family Pseudocorduliidae, while others include it in Corduliidae or Synthemistidae.

Species
The genus Pseudocordulia includes the following two species:
Pseudocordulia circularis 
Pseudocordulia elliptica

References

Synthemistidae
Corduliidae
Anisoptera genera
Odonata of Australia
Endemic fauna of Australia
Taxa named by Robert John Tillyard
Insects described in 1909